Interdisciplinary arts are a combination of arts that use an interdisciplinary approach involving more than one artistic discipline.

Examples of different arts include visual arts, performing arts, musical arts, digital arts, conceptual arts, etc. Interdisciplinary artists apply at least two different approaches to the arts in their artworks. Often a combination of art and technology, typically digital in nature, is involved.

See also
 Electronic Visualisation and the Arts
 Interdisciplinary Arts Department, Columbia College Chicago
 Museums and Digital Culture
 The School of Interdisciplinary Arts, Ohio University

References

Bibliography
 
 
 
 
 
 
 

The arts
Academic discipline interactions